Albert Bryan Sprott (August 7, 1897 – December 19, 1951) was an American middle-distance runner. He competed in the men's 800 metres at the 1920 Summer Olympics.

References

External links
 
 

1897 births
1951 deaths
Athletes (track and field) at the 1920 Summer Olympics
American male middle-distance runners
Olympic track and field athletes of the United States
Track and field athletes from San Diego